James H. McClellan (born 5 October 1947) is the Byers Professor of Signal Processing at the Georgia Institute of Technology. He is widely known for his creation of the McClellan transform and for his co-authorship of the Parks–McClellan filter design algorithm.

Early life and education 
James McClellan was born on October 5, 1947, in Guam. McClellan received his B.S. in Electrical Engineering from Louisiana State University in 1969. He went on to receive an M.S. (1972) and a Ph.D. (1973) from Rice University.

Career 
In 1973, he joined the research staff of MIT's Lincoln Laboratory. In 1975, he became a professor at MIT's Electrical Engineering and Computer Science department before leaving to join Schlumberger. Since 1987, he has been at the Georgia Institute of Technology. Prof. McClellan is a Fellow of the IEEE. He received the Acoustics, Speech, and Signal Processing Technical Achievement Award in 1987, the IEEE Signal Processing Society Award in 1996, and the IEEE Jack S. Kilby Signal Processing Medal in 2004 (together with Thomas W. Parks).

Books 
 Number Theory in Digital Signal Processing, J. H. McClellan and C. M. Rader, Prentice-Hall, Inc., Englewood Cliffs, N.J., 1979, .
 Computer-Based Exercises for Signal Processing Using MATLAB, J. H. McClellan, C. S. Burrus, A. V. Oppenheim, T. W. Parks, R.W. Schafer, H. W. Schuessler, Prentice Hall, 1998, .
 Signal Processing First: A Multimedia Approach, J. H. McClellan, R.W. Schafer, M. A. Yoder, Upper Saddle River, NJ: Prentice-Hall, Inc., 1998, .
 DSP First: A Multimedia Approach, J. H. McClellan, R. W. Schafer, M. A. Yoder, Upper Saddle River, NJ: Prentice-Hall, Inc., 1997, .

References

External links
Department page at the Georgia Institute of Technology.
Faculty profile at the Georgia Institute of Technology.
Technical explanation of the Parks–McClellan FIR filter design algorithm.
Publications from Google Scholar.

American electrical engineers
Louisiana State University alumni
Rice University alumni
Fellow Members of the IEEE
Georgia Tech faculty
Living people
MIT Lincoln Laboratory people
1947 births